Center for the Study of Popular Culture may refer to:

The David Horowitz Freedom Center, founded in the 1980s by political activist David Horowitz; known as the Center for the Study of Popular Culture until July 2006
Bowling Green State University Department of Popular Culture, founded in 1968 by Ray Browne as the Center for the Study of Popular Culture

See also
 Popular culture studies
 The Journal of Popular Culture, formerly published at Bowling Green State University; now headquartered at Michigan State University